Antoaneta Pandjerova (born 22 June 1977) is a retired tennis player from Bulgaria.

On 25 September 2000, she reached her highest WTA singles ranking of 174 whilst her best doubles ranking was 177 on 31 October 1994.

In her career, she won five singles titles and 17 doubles tournaments on the ITF Women's Circuit.

Playing for the Bulgaria Fed Cup team, Pandjerova has accumulated a win–loss record of 8–13 (singles 3–8; doubles 5–5).

ITF Circuit finals

Singles: 10 (5 titles, 5 runner–ups)

Doubles: 27 (17 titles, 10 runner–ups)

References

External links

 
 
 

1977 births
Living people
Sportspeople from Plovdiv
Bulgarian female tennis players